12th Street station is a future DART Light Rail and commuter rail station along the Red Line, Orange Line (Rush Hour only) and the Silver Line in Plano, Texas. 

The station has two levels, with the ground-level at 12th Street & K Avenue serving the Silver Line and the elevated level (two blocks west at 1000 12th Street) serving the Red Line and the Orange Line. The City of Plano approved the purchase of a piece of land in February 2015 in anticipation of its construction.

The station's bus bays and parking lots will be next to the Silver Line platform: the bus bays and a small parking lot on its north side and a larger parking lot on its south side.

The station is scheduled to open with the completion of the Silver Line in late 2025 to mid-2026.

References

Dallas Area Rapid Transit light rail stations
Plano, Texas
Proposed public transportation in Texas
Proposed railway stations in the United States
Dallas Area Rapid Transit commuter rail stations

Railway stations scheduled to open in 2025
Railway stations scheduled to open in 2026